Paratuerta is a genus of moths of the family Noctuidae. The genus was erected by George Hampson in 1902.

Species
 Paratuerta abrupta Rothschild, 1924
 Paratuerta featheri Fawcett, 1915
 Paratuerta marshalli Hampson, 1902
 Paratuerta undulata Berio, 1970

References

Agaristinae